Miguel Arcanjo Arsénio de Oliveira (born May 13, 1932) is an Angolan-born former Portuguese footballer. He played as a central defender.

Career
After playing professionally in Angola with Sporting de Benguela, Arcanjo became one of the most highly sought after football players in the European league. In 1950, he signed a professional contract to play with FC Porto (FCP) in Portugal, making him the first African player in the history of FCP. During a lengthy ship ride from Angola to Portugal, he developed an eye infection that almost ended his soccer career. The following summer of 1951, retina surgery saved Arcanjo from blindness and increased his chances of playing professional once again. Arcanjo was the driving force behind FCP's success in the 1950s to early '60s and went on to become one of the best players in the club's history.

Arcanjo gained 9 caps for Portugal. After establishing himself as the best defender in Portugal, he made his debut on 26 May 1957 in Lisbon against Italy, in a 3-0 victory.

Honours
Porto
Primeira Liga: 1955–56, 1958–59
Taça de Portugal: 1955–56, 1957–58

See also
List of one-club men

References

External links

1932 births
Living people
Portuguese footballers
Association football defenders
Primeira Liga players
FC Porto players
Portugal international footballers
People from Huambo
Angolan emigrants to Portugal